Seek and Destroy was a short lived portmanteau series which aired on the ABC in 1968. It consisted of four BBC plays and one Australian play.

Episodes
"The Death of Socrates" - starring Leo McKern
"The Quarry: Portrait of a Man as a Paralysed Artist"
"The Arrangement" - opera based on Les Liaisons Dangereuses
"The Cell" - the Australian play
"After Many a Summer"

References

1968 Australian television series debuts